The Chanson de l'Oignon ("Song of the Onion") is a French marching song from around 1800.

According to legend, it originated among the Old Guard Grenadiers of Napoleon's Imperial Guard. Before the Battle of Marengo, Napoleon found some grenadiers rubbing an onion on their bread. "Very good," he said, "there is nothing better than an onion for marching on the road to glory."

Music
The verses of the Chanson de l'Oignon are in 6/8, while the refrain is in 2/4. This has the effect of rendering the verses more lyrical and the refrain more military, though both remain the same tempo as befits a marching song.

Lyrics

In popular culture
 The refrain was borrowed for the children's song "J'ai perdu le do de ma clarinette" ("I've lost the C on my clarinet"), and for the Swedish song "Små grodorna" ("The Little Frogs").
 An arrangement of "Chanson de l'Oignon" by Shirō Hamaguchi is featured in Girls und Panzer das Finale as the song for the French-based school BC Freedom Academy.

References

French patriotic songs
19th-century songs